Fanny de Beauharnais, née Marie-Anne-Françoise Mouchard (4 October 1737, Paris – 2 July 1813), was a French lady of letters and salon-holder. She was the mother of French politician Claude de Beauharnais.  She was the grandmother of Stéphanie de Beauharnais, Grand Duchess of Baden, and through her she is the ancestor of former royal families of Romania and Yugoslavia, and the present royal families of Belgium, of Luxembourg and of Monaco.

Life
The daughter of the receiver-general of finances in Champagne, whilst very young she married comte Claude de Beauharnais, uncle of Alexandre de Beauharnais and of François de Beauharnais. She was godmother to Hortense de Beauharnais, Alexandre's daughter by Marie Josèphe Rose de Tascher de la Pagerie, better known to history as Josephine.

She wrote poetry from her childhood onwards and, after separating from her husband, devoted herself to literature, became friends with literary figures such as Claude Joseph Dorat and Michel de Cubières-Palmézeaux. Her salon became a choice social venue, and she became a member of the Académie des Arcades.

In 1787 she wrote and put on a five-act prose comedy entitled la Fausse inconstance, though it was not a success. In 1790 she was received into the Académie de Lyon.

Her detractors attributed her work to Dorat and other friends of hers. The marquise de Créquy, in his Souvenirs, adjudged that Lebrun had very rudely and unjustly applied to her an old epigram of Pavillon about Charlotte-Rose de Caumont La Force:

Marriage and issue
On 6 March 1753, she married Claude de Beauharnais and their children were: 
 Claude de Beauharnais (1756–1819), 2nd Count des Roches-Baritaud (1756–1819).
 Françoise de Beauharnais (1757–1822) 
Anne de Beauharnais (1760–1831)

Works
 Mélanges de poésies fugitives et de prose sans conséquence (Paris, 1772, 2 vol. in-8°)
 Lettres de Stéphanie, historical novel (Paris, 1773, in-8°)
 l’Abailard supposé, novel (Paris, 1780, in-8°)
 l’Île de la Félicité, philosophical poem (1801, in-8°)
 le Voyage de Zizi et d’Azor, poem in 5 books (1811, in-8°).

References
 Gustave Vapereau, Dictionnaire universel des littératures, Paris, Hachette, 1876, p. 217.

External links
 

Writers from Paris
1737 births
1813 deaths
French women poets
Fanny
French salon-holders
18th-century French novelists
19th-century French writers
18th-century French women writers
18th-century French writers
19th-century French women writers
19th-century women writers
18th-century French dramatists and playwrights
French women dramatists and playwrights
French women novelists